Joseph Martin (September 24, 1852 – March 2, 1923) was a lawyer and politician in Manitoba, British Columbia and the United Kingdom often referred to as "Fighting Joe".

Early life
Born in Milton, Canada West, the son of Edward Martin, a former Reeve, and Mary Ann Fleming, Martin was educated at the Milton public school, the Toronto Normal School and University of Toronto. He was a telegraph operator and afterwards obtained a First-class Teacher's certificate, and was appointed principal of the public school in New Edinburgh, Ontario. He studied law in Ottawa and moved to Portage la Prairie, Manitoba in 1882. He was called to the Bar of Manitoba in 1882.

Political career

Manitoba
He was first elected as the member of the Legislative Assembly of Manitoba for the Portage la Prairie riding in 1883 and served as Attorney-General in the government of Thomas Greenway. In 1890, he initiated legislation to end French language instruction and support for Catholic separate schools, prompting the Manitoba Schools Question crisis.

Canada
Martin ran unsuccessfully as a Liberal candidate in the 1891 election to become the Member of Parliament for Selkirk.  When Sir Hugh Macdonald resigned his Winnipeg seat, Martin ran in the 1893 by-election and won by acclamation.  He lost the seat to Macdonald when they both ran for re-election in Selkirk in the 1896 election.  He later ran in the 1908 election as an Independent in the Vancouver City riding but was not elected.

British Columbia
After his defeat in Manitoba, Martin left for British Columbia to settle in Vancouver. He arrived at a time of booming prosperity.  He took up the practice of law and made a fortune developing the Hastings Manor subdivision in Vancouver.

Martin was first elected to the British Columbia Legislative Assembly in 1898 election in the multi-member Vancouver City riding.  The election did not yield a majority for any one party.  With increased representation for mainland ridings and a shift in popular support from the Turner government, a government of special interests, railway industrialists, coal barons, lumber and fishing capitalists, Turner's support fell to 17 of 38 seats.  Lieutenant-Governor Thomas R. McInnes dismissed Turner on August 8, 1898 without allowing him the constitutional right to meet the legislature.  Instead he turned to former premier Robert Beaven, even though he had not been elected in his constituency, to form a government.  He was unable to do so, and McInnes then turned to Charles Semlin to form a government.  Semlin took office as premier and chose Martin as his Attorney-General.

During the two year Semlin government, Martin produced controversy by introducing measures such as an eight-hour work day (opposed by mine owners) and an Alien Exclusion Act to prevent Chinese from owning mining claims.  The federal government, at the instance of American interests, took steps to disallow the legislation.  During a controversial public meeting about the issue, Martin breached cabinet solidarity and criticized his own government resulting in a request from Premier Semlin for Martin's resignation. Semlin reconstituted his ministries and met the legislature facing strong opposition from Martin, often requiring the Speaker of the house to break ties by using his casting vote.  On February 27, 1900 McInnes dismissed Semlin and, the following day, asked Martin to form a government.  The result was a vote of non-confidence by the house which carried by a majority of 28 to 1.  Nevertheless, Martin formed a cabinet and governed for three months before going to the polls in the 1900 election.  Although hard fought, Martin had only 13 supporters elected.  The Semlin faction had even fewer at 6 and Semlin was defeated personally.  Following the election, Prime Minister Laurier dismissed McInnes and appointed Sir Henri-Gustave Joly de Lotbinière lieutenant-governor.  The legislature was able to agree to support James Dunsmuir to lead a government.  Martin served in the opposition (He became the first leader of the Liberal party of British Columbia) until he was defeated in the 1903 election, the first in British Columbia organized on party lines.

In 1907, he founded the Vancouver Guardian newspaper.  After his return from England, he ran in the 1920 election in Vancouver as an Independent under the banner of the Asiatic Exclusion League.  He was defeated and lost his deposit.

Martin, who died of complications from diabetes in March 1923, was the first person in Vancouver to be treated with insulin.

United Kingdom
He moved to the United Kingdom where he won a seat in the British House of Commons as a Liberal Member of Parliament for St Pancras East. He served from 1910 until 1918.

In December 1911, Winston Churchill, then the First Lord of the Admiralty, had announced to the House of Commons that the British fleet was ready for war. Martin fiercely attacked the Admiralty over the grounding of the warship Niobe "only to be completely and unceremoniously silenced by a biting answer from the First Lord."

The St Pancras East Liberal Association and Martin had a difficult relationship. By 1914 the association did not want Martin to continue as their MP and in May selected Richard Leopold Reiss to be their candidate for the general election expected to be called late 1914/early 1915. Martin said he would resign his seat and contest the resulting by-election as an Independent Lib-Lab candidate. Confronted with the prospect of losing the by-election to the Unionist, due to a split Liberal vote, the Liberal association told Martin in June that they would not contest the by-election. In July Martin announced that he would instead resign his seat and return to his native Canada, allowing Reiss to run against a Unionist in the by-election. Martin changed his mind again and decided not to resign his seat. In August war was declared, the general election was deferred, Reiss resigned as candidate to enlisted and Martin continued as MP.

Relations between Martin and his local Liberal association continued to be uncertain. Finally he crossed the floor to join the Labour Party. In early 1918 he was selected to run as Labour candidate in neighbouring Islington South. However, by close of nominations, there was no Labour candidate nominated.

Martin was also a candidate for mayor of Vancouver in 1914 and founded another newspaper there in 1916.

Sources

References

External links

Canadian Encyclopedia

When 'Fisticuffs Ensued' in BC's Legislature, Tom Barrett, The Tyee, May 9, 2013

1852 births
1923 deaths
Premiers of British Columbia
Liberal Party (UK) MPs for English constituencies
Liberal Party of Canada MPs
Leaders of the British Columbia Liberal Party
British Columbia Liberal Party MLAs
Members of the House of Commons of Canada from Manitoba
Attorneys General of British Columbia
People from the Regional Municipality of Halton
UK MPs 1910
UK MPs 1910–1918
Members of the Executive Council of Manitoba
University of Toronto alumni